Newcastle Township is one of eight townships in Fulton County, Indiana. As of the 2010 census, its population was 1,398 and it contained 547 housing units.

History
The John Haimbaugh Round Barn was listed on the National Register of Historic Places in 1993.

Geography
Barr Lake is in this township.

Unincorporated towns
 Talma

Adjacent townships
 Tippecanoe Township, Marshall County (north)
 Franklin Township, Kosciusko County (east)
 Henry Township (southeast)
 Rochester Township (southwest)
 Richland Township (west)
 Walnut Township, Marshall County (northwest)

Major highways
  Indiana State Road 25
  Indiana State Road 110
  Indiana State Road 331

Cemeteries
The township contains four cemeteries: Hamlett, Reister, Sycamore and Yellow Creek.

References
 United States Census Bureau cartographic boundary files
 U.S. Board on Geographic Names

External links
 Indiana Township Association
 United Township Association of Indiana

Townships in Fulton County, Indiana
Townships in Indiana